The  is a role type in Chinese opera for dignified and respectable male characters such as Confucian scholars, nobles, or heads of households. They may be portrayed by either male actors or actresses.

Subtypes

The  has numerous subtypes. Peking opera troupes will always have a  actor. A  actor may be added to play roles fitting to his age. In addition to these main , the troupe will also have a secondary .

The  is a dignified older role, usually distinguished by a long, thin, three-part beard. These characters have a gentle and cultivated disposition and typically wear long robes with water sleeves, high-soled boots, and fabric headdresses.

They wear armors and helmets instead of robes and fabric hats.

They wear paler makeup than  characters to show their youth.  characters are often involved with beautiful young women by virtue of the handsome and young image they project. Depending on the character's rank in society, the costume of the  may be either elaborate or simple. In Peking opera, these characters sing in a high, shrill voice with occasional breaks to represent the voice changing period of adolescence.

The  roles possess martial skills and are frequently young generals.

The  is a martial character for roles involving combat. They are highly trained in acrobatics, and have a natural voice when singing. In Peking opera,  is further divided into two subcategories based on the character's costume:
The  are high-ranking warriors who wear armor, helmets, and high-soled boots. They mainly use prop weapons.
They are more likely to engage in hand-to-hand combat.

Cross-gender acting
In Yue opera,  roles have been mainly portrayed by actresses. Actresses playing men is also common in some southern genres like Teochew opera and Taiwanese opera. It also appears in Ping opera.

In Peking opera, Meng Xiaodong was perhaps the first female superstar who specialized in  roles.

References

Chinese opera role types
Male stock characters